Aranzazu González Muñoz (born 5 June 1975) is a S4 swimmer from Spain. She competed at the 1996 Summer Paralympics in Atlanta, Georgia, winning a gold medal in the 50 meter backstroke, 50 meter freestyle and 100 meter freestyle races.

References

External links 
 
 

1975 births
Living people
Spanish female freestyle swimmers
Spanish female breaststroke swimmers
Paralympic swimmers of Spain
Paralympic gold medalists for Spain
Paralympic medalists in swimming
Swimmers at the 1996 Summer Paralympics
Medalists at the 1996 Summer Paralympics
Sportspeople from San Sebastián
Swimmers from the Basque Country (autonomous community)
S3-classified Paralympic swimmers
20th-century Spanish women